The 1972 Kansas City Chiefs season was the franchise's third season in the National Football League, tenth as the Kansas City Chiefs, and thirteenth overall. The Chiefs moved into the new Arrowhead Stadium and ended with an 8–6 record, runner-up in the AFC West, but missed the playoffs.

The last original member of the franchise (1960 Dallas Texans) departed on July 12 when safety Johnny Robinson announced his retirement at training camp. Starting quarterback Len Dawson ended speculation about his retirement and signed a two-year contract.

After two different construction strikes and a myriad of other delays, Arrowhead Stadium was officially dedicated on August 12, when the Chiefs registered a 24–14 preseason victory over the St. Louis Cardinals. On a very warm Saturday night with an attendance of 78,190, running back Ed Podolak scored the first touchdown in the facility. Regular season ticket prices for this first season at Arrowhead were eight dollars for box seats and $7 for reserved seating.

In the opener on September 17, the Chiefs lost 20–10 to Miami (the first win of their perfect season) in the first regular season game at the new Arrowhead Stadium, in front of a crowd of 79,829. A standing-room-only crowd of 82,094 was in attendance for a 27–14 victory over division rival Oakland on November 5, the largest “in-house” attendance total for an NFL contest in Arrowhead's history. After a 5–3 start, a three-game losing streak effectively eliminated the club from playoff contention. An 8–6 record was only good enough for a second-place finish in the AFC West, 2½ games behind Oakland. Linebacker Willie Lanier became the first Chiefs player to receive the prestigious NFL Man of the Year Award in the offseason.

In week six, the Chiefs dropped a shocking 21–20 decision at home to the lowly Philadelphia Eagles, who entered the game 0–5 and won only once more (also a one-point victory, over the Houston Oilers, who finished 1–13). It was the only time the Chiefs and Eagles met until 1992, and Kansas City did not visit Philadelphia until 1998.

Offseason

NFL draft

Roster

Preseason

Regular season

Schedule

Standings

Game summaries

Week 1: vs. Miami Dolphins

Week 2: at New Orleans Saints

Week 3: at Denver Broncos

Week 4: at Cleveland Browns

Week 5: vs. Cincinnati Bengals

Week 6: vs. Philadelphia Eagles

Week 7: at San Diego Chargers

Week 8: vs. Oakland Raiders

Week 9: at Pittsburgh Steelers

Week 10: vs. San Diego Chargers

Week 11: at Oakland Raiders

Week 12: vs. Denver Broncos

Week 13: vs. Baltimore Colts

Week 14: at Atlanta Falcons

References 

Kansas City Chiefs
Kansas City Chiefs seasons
Kansas